The USC Upstate Spartans baseball team is a varsity intercollegiate athletic team of the University of South Carolina Upstate in Spartanburg, South Carolina, United States. The team is a member of the Big South Conference, which is part of the National Collegiate Athletic Association's Division I. The team plays its home games at Harley Park in Spartanburg, South Carolina. The Spartans are coached by Mike McGuire.

MLB Draft Selections 
USC Upstate has had 15 Major League Baseball Draft selections since the draft began in 1965.

References

External links 
 USC Upstate Baseball

 
Baseball teams established in 1986
1986 establishments in South Carolina